Parlett is an English surname. Notable people with the surname include: 

 Blake Parlett (born 1989), Canadian ice hockey player
 David Parlett (born 1939), games scholar, historian, and translator
 Reg Parlett (1904–1991), English comic book artist

See also
 Parlett, Ohio, an unincorporated community
 Parlet, band